Ismailov, İsmayılov or Ismaylov is a masculine surname common in the former Soviet countries, its feminine counterpart is Ismailova, İsmayılova or Ismaylova. It is slavicised from the given name Ismail. It is most common in Russia and Uzbekistan. It may refer to:

Ismailava
Leila Ismailava (born 1989), Belarusian journalist

Ismailov
Abduhashim Ismailov, Kurdish musician from Uzbekistan
Abdulkhakim Ismailov (1916–2010), Soviet soldier
Adam Ismailov (born 1976), Russian football player
Aleksandr Ismailov (born 1951), Lithuanian orientalist turkologist
Ali Ismayilov (born 1974), Azerbaijani boxer 
Aliyar Ismailov (born 1976), Russian football player
Anzur Ismailov (born 1985), Uzbekistani football player
Eduard Ismailov (born 1990), Ukrainian football defender
Hamid Ismailov (born 1954), Uzbekistani journalist
Jamshed Ismailov (born 1987), Tajikistani football player
Ruslan Ismailov (sport shooter) (born 1986), Kyrgyzstani sport shooter
Ruslan Ismailov (swimmer) (born 1989), Kyrgyzstani swimmer
Tagi Ismailov (1887–1958), Azerbaijani military commander
Telman Ismailov (born 1956), Azerbaijani-born Russian-Turkish entrepreneur and businessman
Temur Ismailov (born 1995), Uzbekistani tennis player

Ismailova
Tolekan Ismailova, Kyrgyz human rights defender
Tanzila Ismailova, (born 1997), Slunsekarre. Reached top 600 of the game 2048. Better known as an Artiste.

Ismayilov
Adil Ismayilov (1957–2020), Azerbaijani lawyer and investigator
Daniyar İsmayilov (born 1992), Turkmenistani-Turkish weightlifter
Elchin Ismayilov (born 1982), Azerbaijani judoka
Huseynali Ismayilov (born 1961), Azerbaijani academic
Najafgulu Ismayilov (1923–1990), Azerbaijani painter
Rashad Ismayilov (born 1974),  Azerbaijani diplomat

See also
Qasım İsmayılov
Izmaylov
İsmailoğlu

References

Surnames of Azerbaijani origin
Azerbaijani-language surnames
Surnames of Uzbekistani origin
Uzbek-language surnames
Surnames of Tajikistani origin
Tajik-language surnames
Patronymic surnames
Surnames from given names